The Savoia-Marchetti S.64 was a monoplane developed in Italy in 1928 specifically to contest the world duration and distance records.

Design
The S.64 was an unusual pod-and-boom design, with the empennage carried on two open truss structures that extended aft from the wings, similar to the arrangement used on the S.55. The powerplant was mounted on a set of cabane struts above the wing, and consisted of a single engine driving a pusher propeller. The cockpit was located inside the stubby fuselage pod and was fully enclosed. The S.64 made its first flight on 3 April 1928 with Alessandro Passeleva at the controls.

Record flights 
On 31 May 1928, Arturo Ferrarin and Carlo Del Prete broke three world records in the S.64 by making 51 round trips between Torre Flavia (in Ladispoli) and Anzio. When they landed on 3 June, they had covered 7,666 km (4,791 mi) – a new world distance record over a closed circuit – and stayed aloft for 58 hours 34 minutes – a new world endurance record. Moreover, they also set the world record for top speed over a distance of 5,000 km (3,110 mi) of 139 km/h (87 mph). With the record attempt successfully concluded, an announcement was made that this was to be a proving exercise for a Rome–New York City transatlantic flight.

The following month Ferrarin and Del Prete did indeed cross the Atlantic in the S.64, not to New York, but across the South Atlantic to Brazil. Departing Montecelio on the evening of 3 July, they flew over Sardinia overnight, and then Gibraltar early the next morning. During 4 July their course covered Casablanca and Villa Cisneros, and by that evening they were over the Cape Verde islands and headed for Brazil. On the morning of 5 July, they were within radio range of Pernambuco. Crossing the Brazilian coast near Natal, they continued south, hoping to reach Rio de Janeiro. However, poor weather forced the aviators to turn back towards Natal. Now running low on fuel and with the weather still against them, they were forced to abandon landing there as well, since the aerodrome lay behind a row of hills. Instead, they continued north for another 160 km (100 mi) and made a forced landing on a beach at Touros. A Brazilian mail plane conveyed Ferrarin and Del Prete first to Natal and then to Rio de Janeiro, where in both cities they were given a heroes' welcome. The S.64 suffered structural damage during its landing on the sand, and was brought to Rio de Janeiro by ship. When it arrived in the city, it was donated to Brazil. During the flight from Italy, the S.64 had covered 8,100 km (5,030 mi) in 48 hours, 14 minutes. The FAI officially recognised this as a flight of 7,188 km (4,500 mi) – the orthodromic distance between Montecelio and Natal – and a new world straight-line distance record. The festivities in Rio de Janeiro continued for weeks, but came to an end when Ferrarin and Del Prete crashed during a demonstration flight in a S.62 on 11 August. Del Prete died from his injuries five days later.

S.64bis
In 1930, a second, improved S.64, designated the S.64bis, set out to reconquer the duration and closed-circuit distance records that been broken since Ferrarin and Del Prete's flight. Between 30 May and 2 June, Umberto Maddalena and Fausto Cecconi flew from Montecelio in a closed circuit and covered 8,188 km (5,088 mi) in 67 hours 14 minutes, establishing new distance and duration records. They were preparing to again contest the endurance record in the S.64 when the aircraft crashed into the sea off Pisa on 19 March 1931. Maddalena and Cecconi were both killed, along with their mechanic, Giuseppe Da Monte. The wreckage was too widely dispersed for the cause of the accident to be determined with any certainty, but the Commission of Inquiry suspected that the crankshaft may have broken, causing the propeller to penetrate various parts of the aircraft.

The achievements of Ferrarin and Del Prete, and the S.64, are commemorated in Rio de Janeiro's Praça Carlo Del Prete with a statue of Del Prete and a 1:2 scale bronze model of the aircraft.

Specifications (S.64)

References

S.64
1920s Italian special-purpose aircraft
High-wing aircraft
Single-engined pusher aircraft
Aircraft first flown in 1928